The South Carolina State Bulldogs football team represents South Carolina State University in college football. The Bulldogs play in the NCAA Division I Football Championship Subdivision (FCS) as a member of the Mid-Eastern Athletic Conference (MEAC). A historically dominant football program, the Bulldogs lead the MEAC in conference championships.  The school has produced four players enshrined in the Pro Football Hall of Fame including Harry Carson, Deacon Jones, Marion Motley, and Donnie Shell.  Other legendary Bulldog players include Robert Porcher, Shaquille Leonard, Charlie Brown and Orlando Brown Sr. among others.  Legendary former SC State Coach Willie Jeffries became the first African American Head Coach of a predominantly white Division I-A football program, when he was hired to coach the Wichita State football program in 1979.  Jeffries is enshrined in the College Football Hall of Fame.

History

Classifications
1946–1972: NCAA College Division
1967–1969: NAIA
1970–1978: NAIA Division I
1973–1977: NCAA Division II
1978–present: NCAA Division I–AA/FCS

Conference memberships
1907–1938: Independent
1939–1970: Southern Intercollegiate Athletic Conference
1971–present: Mid-Eastern Athletic Conference

South Carolina State vs. In-State NCAA Division I schools

Championships

National Championships 
The Bulldogs have been awarded the black college football national championship five times in program history.

Conference Championships 

*denotes co-champions

Division I-AA/FCS Playoffs results
The Bulldogs have appeared in the I-AA/FCS playoffs six times with a record of 2–6.

Bowl game results
The Bulldogs have appeared in 14 bowl games, with a record of 7–7.

Professional Football Hall of Fame members (Canton, Ohio)
Harry Carson
Deacon Jones
Marion Motley
Donnie Shell

College Football Hall of Fame members
Harry Carson
Willie Jeffries
Donnie Shell
Deacon Jones*

Alumni in the NFL
Over 40 South Carolina State alumni have played in the NFL, including:

Phillip Adams
Charlie Brown
Orlando Brown Sr.
Rafael Bush
Barney Bussey
Harry Carson
Barney Chavous
Anthony Cook
 Cobie Durant
John Gilliam
Javon Hargrave
Dwayne Harper
Antonio Hamilton
Temarrick Hemingway
Willie Holman
Deacon Jones
William Judson
Angelo King
James Lee
Shaquille Leonard
Marshall McFadden
Kimario McFadden
Ervin Parker
Robert Porcher
Joe Thomas
Christian Thompson
Chatrick "Chuck" Darby

Rivalries
SC State has maintained heated rivalries with the North Carolina A&T Aggies, Florida A&M Rattlers, and Bethune-Cookman Wildcats.

NCAA Record
On November 19, 2016, Joe Thomas Sr., father of Green Bay Packers linebacker Joe Thomas, became the oldest player to play in an NCAA Division I game.  At 55 years of age, Thomas Sr. had one carry for three yards as a running back in a contest versus Savannah State.

See also
list of black college football classics

References

External links
 

 
American football teams established in 1907
1907 establishments in South Carolina